The Bardo National Museum is a museum of Tunis, Tunisia, located in the suburbs of Le Bardo.

It is one of the most important museums in the Mediterranean region and the second museum of the African continent after the Egyptian Museum of Cairo by richness of its collections. It traces the history of Tunisia over several millennia and across several civilizations through a wide variety of archaeological pieces.

Housed in an old beylical palace since 1888, it has been the setting for the exhibition of many major works discovered since the beginning of archaeological research in the country. Originally called Alaoui Museum, named after the reigning bey at the time, it takes its current name of Bardo Museum after the independence of the country even if the denomination is attested before that date.

The museum houses one of the largest collections of Roman mosaics in the world, thanks to excavations at the beginning of 20th century in various archaeological sites in the country including Carthage, Hadrumetum, Dougga and Utica. Generally, the mosaics of Bardo, such as the Virgil Mosaic, represent a unique source for research on everyday life in Roman Africa. From the Roman era, the museum also contains a rich collection of marble statues representing the deities and the Roman emperors found on different sites including those of Carthage and Thuburbo Majus.

The museum also houses pieces discovered during the excavations of Libyco-Punic sites including Carthage, although the National Museum of Carthage is the primary museum of the Carthage archaeological site. The essential pieces of this department are grimacing masks, terracotta statues and stelae of major interest for Semitic epigraphy, and the stele of the priest and the child. The museum also houses Greek works discovered especially in the excavations of the shipwreck of Mahdia, whose emblematic piece remains the bust of Aphrodite in marble, gnawed by the sea.

The Islamic Department contains, in addition to famous works such as the Blue Qur'an of Kairouan, a collection of ceramics from the Maghreb and Anatolia.

In order to increase the reception capacity and optimize the presentation of the collections, the museum is the subject of a vast operation which was to be completed initially in 2011 but was not finished until 2012 due to the Tunisian Revolution. The work concerns the increase of the exhibition surfaces by adding new buildings and redeploying the collections. The project aims to make the museum a major pole for a quality cultural development, so that the visitor can appreciate the artistic pieces deposited.

On March 18, 2015, an Islamist terrorist group attacked the museum and took tourists hostage in the building. The attack, which killed 22 people including 21 foreign tourists, was claimed by ISIS.

Location and description

The Bardo National Museum building was originally a 15th-century Hafsid palace, located in the suburbs of Tunis.

The Bardo is one of the most important museums of the Mediterranean basin, and the second largest on the African continent after the Egyptian Museum. It traces the history of Tunisia over several millennia and through many civilizations through a wide variety of archaeological pieces. Being in the former palace, it offers many major works discovered since the beginnings of archaeological research in the country. Originally called Museum Alaoui (المتحف العلوي), the name of the reigning bey at the time, it has had its current name of Museum of Bardo only since the country's independence.

In addition to famous works such as the Blue Koran of Kairouan, the Islamic Department contains a collection of ceramics from North Africa and Asia Minor.

The Bardo brings together one of the finest and largest collections of Roman mosaics in the world thanks to the excavations undertaken from the beginning of the 20th century on archaeological sites in the country including Carthage, Hadrumetum, Dougga, or Utica. The mosaics represent a unique source for research on everyday life in Roman Africa. The museum also contains a rich collection of marble statues representing the gods and Roman emperors found on various sites including those of Carthage and Thuburbo Majus.

The Bardo has also rich pieces discovered during the excavations of Libyco-Punic sites including mainly Carthage, although the Carthage National Museum also possesses an important collection. The main parts of this department are grimacing masks, terracotta statues and stelae of major interest for the Semitic epigraphy, the stele of the priest and the child being the most famous. The museum also houses Greek works discovered in particular in the excavations of the ship of Mahdia, whose iconic piece is a marble bust of Aphrodite.

The museum underwent a major refurbishment, completed in 2012, that was interrupted due to the Tunisian revolution. The expansion, which added 9,000 square meters to the complex, was designed by SCPA Codou-Hindley (France) and Amira Nouira (Tunisia). Considerable funding came from the World Bank.

Collections
It contains a major collection of Roman mosaics and other antiquities of interest from Ancient Greece, Carthage, Tunisia, and the Islamic period.

The museum displays objects ranging from pre-historical artifacts to modern jewelry.

2015 terrorist attack

On 18 March 2015, 24 people were killed in a terrorist attack when three terrorists in civil uniform attacked the Bardo National Museum in the Tunisian capital city of Tunis, and took hostages. Twenty-one people, mostly European tourists, were killed at the scene, while an additional victim died ten days later. Around fifty others were injured. This attack took place after the famous Charlie Hebdo attack in Paris where many journalists were killed   Two of the gunmen, Tunisian citizens Yassine Labidi and Saber Khachnaoui, were killed by police, while the third attacker is currently at large. Police treated the event as a terrorist attack. It was the deadliest terrorist attack in Tunisian history; surpassing the 2002 Ghriba synagogue bombing, which killed twenty-one people, most of whom were also European tourists, and injured more than thirty others.

Gallery

Technologies 
Starting from June 17, 2014, the museum offers visitors a digital guide in English, French, and Arabic. Developed by Orange Tunisia using Near-field communication technology, it comes in the form of a free downloadable application for smartphones and visitors can also borrow a free smartphone at the museum entrance. It offers audio commentaries, photo slideshows, and a historical and geographical perspective of the displayed works.

See also

Culture of Tunisia
List of museums in Tunisia
History of Tunisia
History of Carthage
Ancient Carthage
Mosaic of Dominus Julius, Carthage
North Africa during Antiquity
Carthage National Museum
Carthage Paleo-Christian Museum
El Djem Archaeological Museum
Nabeul Museum
Mosaic of Dominus Julius, Carthage

References

External links

 The National Bardo Museum

Buildings and structures in Tunisia
Moorish architecture
Archaeological museums in Tunisia
National museums
Museums of ancient Greece
Museums of ancient Rome
Tunisian monarchy
Tourist attractions in Tunisia
Museums established in 1888
1880s establishments in Tunisia
1888 establishments in Africa